Lalfakzuala Renthlei (born 14 May 1984) is an Indian cricketer. He made his Twenty20 debut on 14 November 2019, for Mizoram in the 2019–20 Syed Mushtaq Ali Trophy. He made his first-class debut on 27 January 2020, for Mizoram in the 2019–20 Ranji Trophy.

References

External links
 

1984 births
Living people
Indian cricketers
Mizoram cricketers
Place of birth missing (living people)